Robertson County Courthouse in Springfield, Tennessee dates from 1879.  The building's north wing, south wing, and central clock tower were added in 1929–30. The architect was W.C. Smith and the building contractor was the firm of Patton & McInturff.  The architects for the expansion were Edward E. Dougherty and Thomas W. Gardner of Nashville.

The building was listed on the National Register of Historic Places in 1978.

References

Government buildings completed in 1879
Buildings and structures in Robertson County, Tennessee
County courthouses in Tennessee
Clock towers in Tennessee
Courthouses on the National Register of Historic Places in Tennessee
National Register of Historic Places in Robertson County, Tennessee